Carlos Humberto Villatoro Escobedo, known as Carlos Villatoro (14 January 1903 – 14 March 1963) was a Mexican screenwriter and film actor.

Selected filmography
 Dos Monjes (1934)
 Dreams of Love (1935)
 Luponini from Chicago (1935)
 Judas (1936)
 La Mujer sin Alma (1943)

References

Bibliography
 Vázquez Bernal, Esperanza; Dávalos Orozco, Federico. Carlos Villatoro: pasajes en la vida de un hombre de cine. National Autonomous University of Mexico, 1999.
 García Riera, Emilio. Historia documental del cine mexicano: 1929-1937. University of Guadalajara, 1992.

External links

1903 births
1963 deaths
Mexican male film actors
Mexican male silent film actors
Male actors from Mexico City
Writers from Mexico City
People from Comitán
20th-century Mexican screenwriters
20th-century Mexican male writers